Bob Bryan and Mike Bryan were the defending champions, but lost in the quarterfinals to Jeff Coetzee and Wesley Moodie.

Rafael Nadal and Tommy Robredo won in the final 6–3, 6–3, against Mahesh Bhupathi and Mark Knowles.

Seeds
All seeds receive a bye into the second round.

Draw

Finals

Top half

Bottom half

External links
Association of Tennis Professionals (ATP) draw

Doubles